The Banque Industrielle de Chine (BIC, "Industrial Bank of China") was a French bank with its main activities in China and French Indochina. It was created in 1913, expanded rapidly, but collapsed in 1921, causing major political controversy. Its activity was continued by the Franco-Chinese Bank, in China until the 1950s and in Indochina until the 1970s.

Background

From the late 19th century, the Banque de l'Indochine was tasked by the French government to support French commercial, industrial and strategic interests in China, but its conservative stance elicited frustration in French official circles. It was perceived in contrast to the greater dynamism of its British and German counterparts, especially the Deutsch-Asiatische Bank.

These concerns became more salient following the 1911 Revolution in China, as French diplomats and political forces such as the Radical Party were eager to support the fledgling Republic of China, whereas the Banque de l'Indochine was closer to conservative and reactionary circles which did not share the same enthusiasm. In Beijing, Alexis-Joseph Pernotte, a banker who had lived in China since 1903 and had led the Tianjin branch of the Banque de l'Indochine since 1910, promoted the project of a new bank, and in July 1912 obtained a preliminary agreement from Prime Minister Lu Zhengxiang and Finance Minister Xiong Xiling that the Chinese government would support the venture and subscribe one-third of its initial capital. He also emphasized the depth of the Paris financial market, which the bank would allow the Chinese government to access for its future borrowing, thus justifying the Franco-Chinese partnership from the standpoint of China’s national interest.

Creation and expansion

In line with the previous year's agreement, the Chinese government owned a third of the bank's equity capital. From the start and until the collapse in 1921, the bank's chairman was Philippe's brother André Berthelot, and Pernotte was its chief executive.

The bank was incorporated in Paris, where its board of directors held its meetings. On  it moved its seat to 74 rue Saint-Lazare, after having initially been hosted in Charles Victor's business offices. In China, it was managed from Beijing, and opened a branch in Shanghai in 1914. It had its first major project in 1914, underwriting bonds for the construction of port facilities in Pukou District, across the Yangtze from Nanjing. It further opened offices in Tianjin in early 1916, in Hong Kong and Saigon in 1917, and sub-offices of the latter in Hanoi and across the Chinese border in Yunnan-fu (now Kunming) in 1918. That same year, the bank planned a major new building for its branch in Shanghai, on the corner of the newly created Avenue Edward VII (now Yan'an Road) and the Bund. In 1918, like the Banque de l'Indochine, it opened an office in Vladivostok to serve the Allied military base there during the Siberian intervention.

The bank's expansion accelerated with the business expansion that immediately followed the end of World War I. In March 1920, it became the first French bank licensed to operate in New York. By late 1920 it had added more offices in China (Fuzhou, Guangzhou, Hankou, Mukden, and Shantou) and elsewhere (Antwerp, London, Lyon, Marseille, Singapore, and Yokohama).

Restructuring and controversy

As early as April 1917, the French Finance Ministry's  had started to voice doubts about the bank's soundness, in a note that highlighted poor cost control, loans to risky borrowers at below-market rates, and above-market remuneration of current accounts. The note concluded with a suggestion that the bank may need to be merged into the Banque de l'Indochine to avoid financial collapse.

In early 1921, financial stress became acute. The bank had made risky investments in ventures unrelated to China, in France, Madagascar, Poland and other places. It had made bets on commodities markets, especially rice, that turned wrong. Most board members resigned in early February 1921. In late January, the French government and the Bank of France fostered a collective support package with contributions from the colonial government of French Indochina (30 million Francs), the Banque de Paris et des Pays-Bas (22 million), the Banque de l'Indochine (16 million), and other banks (Bankers Trust, Société Générale, Banque Française pour le Commerce et l'Industrie, Rothschilds, Sudameris, Banca Commerciale Italiana, Banque de la Seine, and Crédit mobilier français) for lesser individual amounts adding up to 65 million, to which the government added £150,000 that it had recently withdrawn from the BIC's London branch. Despite this temporary relief, the BIC faced runs on its operations in China and Indochina.

From that point, the failure of the Banque Industrielle de Chine became a matter of major public attention and generated one of France's most prominent business-related controversies of the era, including repeated debates in France's Chamber of Deputies. Even before that moment of public salience, in the spring of 1921 when the BIC's financial distress was only known to well-informed Parisian circles, two opposite camps had coalesced around it. The coalition defending the bank and advocating a bailout by the French government included much of the Foreign Ministry - where Philippe Berthelot was then Secretary-General, the highest-ranking civil servant - as well as the Banque de Paris et des Pays-Bas (BPPB); and at the political level, Aristide Briand, Foreign Minister and simultaneously Prime Minister, and Louis Loucheur, Minister of Liberated Regions. The BPPB's chief executive Horace Finaly was close to Philippe Berthelot, as were many Parisian diplomacy-connected luminaries including Paul Claudel, Colette, Paul Morand, and Saint-John Perse. The anti-BIC coalition included much of the Finance Ministry, led by the conservative Paul Doumer, and the Banque de l'Indochine. 

The intermingling of business, political and national interests was a major dimension of the related debates. The pro-BIC narrative portrayed the bank's difficulties as caused by a general economic and financial crisis in East Asia, rather than by its own failures to control costs and manage risks; its supporters advocated the use of public money to bail it out on the basis that France's international reputation was at stake. As leading insider journalist  described the BIC defenders' argument: "No French bank has ever failed abroad, and one had to think that the BIC's demise would be a terrible blow to our influence in the Far East." The opposing camp had much less media firepower with Nalèche's Journal des débats and the far-right L'Action francaise. Overall, the controversies over the BIC illustrated the lack of independence of the French press vis-à-vis major financial interests. Even though there was no indication of direct corruption by the BIC, Philippe Berthelot personally benefited from the wealth of his brother.

Meanwhile, the respected sinologist Georges Maspero had replaced André Berthelot as the bank's president.

In early 1922, the French parliament enacted legislation to use France's residual share of the Boxer Indemnity to reimburse the BIC's Chinese claimants; after tortuous negotiations, an agreement to that effect was reached with the Chinese government in April 1925. The former BIC continued to exist as a legal entity, still chaired by Georges Maspero until the late 1930s, even though it was managed by the Franco-Chinese bank; it was eventually wound up in 1950.

Banknotes

Like other foreign banks in China at the time, the Banque Industrielle de Chine issued paper currency in the concessions where it had established branch offices.

See also
 Deutsch-Asiatische Bank
 Russo-Asiatic Bank

References

Financial history of China
Defunct banks of France
Defunct banks of China
Banks established in 1913
Banks disestablished in 1922
Chinese companies established in 1913
1922 disestablishments in China